Rosenbergia scutellaris is a species of beetle in the family Cerambycidae. It was described by Per Olof Christopher Aurivillius in 1924.

References

Batocerini
Beetles described in 1924